The Unknown is the first album by German singer-songwriter Madeline Juno. It was released on March 7, 2014, by Polydor and peaked at number 24 on the German album charts.

Background 
Juno had worked on the album for four years. She started in 2009 when she was 14 years old and has uploaded some of her songs on YouTube. She wrote the song "Melancholy Heartbeat" at the age of 14. During an interview Juno stated that her favourite song is "Like Lovers Do". Juno describes the album as "acoustic and melodic music full of hope" and calls her music "Heart-Core". All songs are in English and were written by Madeline Juno, David Jost and Dave Roth.

Release and promotion 
The Unknown was released on March 7, 2014 in Germany, Austria and Switzerland. It could be pre-ordered since February 16, 2014, on iTunes. Everyone who pre-ordered got a free copy of the singles "Error" and "Sympathy". Erhältlich ist das Album als CD und Download. On December 13, 2013 it was announced that Madeline Juno would perform on the German national final for the Eurovision Song Contest 2014 called Unser Song für Dänemark für den Eurovision Song Contest 2014 where she performs the singles Error and Like Lovers Do. Juno participates on Adel Tawil's tour Lieder-Tour 2014.

Track listing

Personnel 
 Patrick Benzner: record producer
 David Jost: composer
 Madeline Juno: vocals, composer
 Dave Roth: composer, producer

Charts

Lieder tour 2014 
Madeline Juno took part in the Lieder of the German singer Adel Tawil where she served as a supporting act.

External links 
 The Unknown at Universal Music Deutschland
 The Unknown at austriancharts.at
 The Unknown at musicload.de

References 

2014 debut albums
Madeline Juno albums
Polydor Records albums